The Colne Valley Waterworks railway was a  narrow gauge industrial railway connecting the London, Midland and Scottish Railway (LMS) Watford to Rickmansworth branch line with the Eastbury Pumping Station.

History
The Colne Valley Water Company opened the Eastbury Pumping Station near Watford in 1873. In 1931 the company opened a narrow gauge railway connecting the pumping station with the LMS standard gauge branch line between Watford and Rickmansworth. The line ran southeast from a private siding on the LMS line, crossed the River Colne by a relatively substantial plate girder bridge and ended in a yard at the pumping station. The railway carried coal to power the pumping station and chlorine and salt for the water softening plant.

Decline and closure
The pumping station switched from coal to diesel power in 1956; after this use of the railway declined significantly. Chlorine and salt were still carried by rail. The line closed in 1967. The two locomotives were purchased for preservation.

Locomotives

See also
 List of narrow gauge railways at water treatment and sewage works in Great Britain

References 

 

2 ft gauge railways in England
Industrial railways in England